Saakow is a town in southern Somalia and is located in the Middle Juba (Jubbada Dhexe) region of Somalia. It lies between Bu'ale, Dinsoor and Bardera.

See also
History of Somalia
Jubaland
Middle Juba

References

Populated places in Middle Juba